At the 2001 Summer Universiade, the athletics events were held in Beijing, People's Republic of China between 27 August and 1 September. A total of 45 events were contested, of which 23 by male and 22 by female athletes. The host country, China, took the most gold medals (9) and the most medals overall (16). The United States were a close second with a total of 8 golds. Five Universiade records were broken during the course of the athletics competition.

Amongst the gold medallists for the host country were Dong Yanmei, who won golds in the women's 5000 and 10,000 metres races, and 18-year-old Liu Xiang in the 110 metres hurdles. It was Liu's first gold on a world stage and he became the 2004 Olympic champion in world record time three years later. As well as Dong, three other athletes took medals in multiple individual events: Gennadiy Chernovol won silver in both the 100 and 200 metres for Kazakhstan, Swiss athlete Christian Belz won two bronze medals via the 5000 m and steeplechase races, and Brazilian Maurren Maggi took the women's long jump gold and a silver medal in the 100 metres hurdles.

Records

Medal summary

Men

Women

Medal table

References
World Student Games (Universiade – Men). GBR Athletics. Retrieved on 2010-02-18.
World Student Games (Universiade – Women). GBR Athletics. Retrieved on 2010-02-18.
Finals results (archived)

External links
Official 2001 Universiade website

 
2001
Universiade
2001 Summer Universiade
2001 Summer Universiade
Athletics in Beijing